Corymbia aparrerinja, commonly known as ghost gum, is a species of tree that is endemic to Central Australia. It has smooth bark, lance-shaped or curved adult leaves, flower buds in groups of three or seven, white flowers and cup-shaped to cylindrical fruit.

Description
It has smooth, sometimes powdery, white to cream-coloured and pinkish bark that is shed in thin patches. Flowering occurs in summer and the flowers are white.

Taxonomy and naming
Corymbia aparrerinja was first formally described in 1995 by Ken Hill and Lawrie Johnson from specimens collected on Gosses Bluff by Herbert Basedow in 1925. The same specimens were used by William Blakely to describe (in English), Eucalyptus papuana F.Muell. var. aparrerinja, but did not provide a Latin diagnosis ("description"), so the name was not validly published.

Distribution and habitat
Ghost gum occurs in arid areas of Central Australia on rocky slopes, red sand flats and dry creek beds. It is found from near Giles in Western Australia, through the south of the Northern Territory as far north as Tennant Creek to near Mount Isa and Barcaldine in Queensland.

Uses
Parts of this tree were used by Indigenous Australians to treat colds.

Culture
In 1891 in Barcaldine, a ghost gum known as the Tree of Knowledge, was the focal point of a gathering of striking sheep shearers, a key event leading to the formation of the Australian Labor Party.

This species of tree features in aboriginal Dreamtime stories and gained prominence with the wider public in the 20th century through the paintings of aboriginal artist Albert Namatjira.

See also
List of Corymbia species

References

Trees of Australia
aparrerinja
Myrtales of Australia
Flora of the Northern Territory
Flora of Queensland
Rosids of Western Australia
Drought-tolerant trees
Plants described in 1995